Mimathyma chevana, the sergeant emperor, is an Indomalayan butterfly of the family Nymphalidae. The species was first described by Frederic Moore in 1865.

There are two subspecies:
M. c. chevana Sikkim, Assam, northern Myanmar
M. c. leechii Moore, [1896] western and central China

Mimathyma chevana mimics Athyma opalina.

References 

chevana
Butterflies described in 1865